Pleasantville Bridge is a historic wooden covered bridge located at Oley Township in Berks County, Pennsylvania. It was built in two stages due to wood shortages after the Great Flood of 1850. It crosses the Manatawny Creek. It is one of five covered bridges remaining in Berks County.

It was listed on the National Register of Historic Places in 1981.

Gallery

See also
List of bridges documented by the Historic American Engineering Record in Pennsylvania

References

External links

Berks County Covered Bridges

Historic American Engineering Record in Pennsylvania
Covered bridges on the National Register of Historic Places in Pennsylvania
Covered bridges in Berks County, Pennsylvania
Bridges completed in 1856
Wooden bridges in Pennsylvania
Bridges in Berks County, Pennsylvania
National Register of Historic Places in Berks County, Pennsylvania
Road bridges on the National Register of Historic Places in Pennsylvania
Burr Truss bridges in the United States